The Independent Commission on Civil Aviation Noise (ICCAN) was an advisory non-departmental public body of the Government of the United Kingdom with responsibility for civil aviation noise, and how it affects communities.

The stated objectives of the commission were to "increase trust, transparency and clarity in the aviation noise debate", to "promote consistency, responsibility and accountability within the industry and beyond", and to establish its authority and credibility as a body. It was dissolved in September 2021.

History
ICCAN was formed in January 2019, in order to act as an impartial and independent voice on aviation noise and how it affects communities. Robert Light was appointed as its Head Commissioner on 19 November 2018, and a further four commissioners have been appointed since. Sam Hartley became the Secretary to the Commission on 7 January 2019, previously serving as the Deputy Director of Devolution Strategy for the Cabinet Office and Secretary to the Boundary Commission for England.

Structure
ICCAN consists of five commissioners and is headed by a Head Commissioner, currently Rob Light, which is supported by a secretariat. ICCAN is currently based in Woking, Surrey.

Commissioners

As of its dissolution, ICCAN had five commissioners, headed by Robert Light:

Responsibilities

ICCAN followed a programme of activity based on the Department for Transport's "2017 Airspace Policy Consultation Response". ICCAN's job was to make recommendations to the Government's approach to how aviation noise can managed, and how its reporting and management of aviation noise can be made more open and transparent. The Government will decide in 2021 whether or not ICCAN should be granted more authority; it opted to dissolve ICCAN in September 2021.

Sources

Non-departmental public bodies of the United Kingdom government